The Sturgeon River is a river in the Hudson Bay drainage basin located in Kenora and Thunder Bay Districts in northwestern Ontario, Canada.

The CN transcontinental rail line crosses the river at its mouth near Robinson, and Highway 599 crosses at the eastern end near its head.

Tributaries
Barnard Creek
Lake of Bays River

See also
List of rivers of Ontario

References

Rivers of Kenora District
Rivers of Thunder Bay District
Tributaries of Hudson Bay